Peter Marchant (31 December 1920 – 12 September 1977) was a British sports shooter. He competed in the 50 m pistol event at the 1948 Summer Olympics.

Marchant was educated at Sutton Valence School.

References

External links
 

1920 births
1977 deaths
British male sport shooters
Olympic shooters of Great Britain
Shooters at the 1948 Summer Olympics
People from Ashford, Kent
People educated at Sutton Valence School